HMS Lapwing (U62) was a Modified  sloop of the Royal Navy.

Named after the bird of the same name, she was built by Scotts Shipbuilding and Engineering Company, Greenock, on the banks of the River Clyde. She was launched on 16 July 1943.

Hit amidships she sank within 20 minutes with the loss of 158 lives. 61 men were rescued.

Construction and design
Lapwing was one of eight Modified Black Swan-class sloops ordered by the Admiralty on 27 March 1941 as part of the 1940 Supplemental War Programme. The Modified Black Swans were an improved version of the pre-war Black Swan-class sloops, with greater beam, allowing a heavier close-in anti-aircraft armament to be accommodated.

Two Admiralty three-drum water-tube boilers provided steam to Parsons geared steam turbines which drove two shafts.

The ship's main gun armament (as fitted to all the Modified Black Swans) consisted of 3 twin QF 4 inch (102 mm) Mk XVI guns, in dual purpose mounts, capable of both anti-ship and anti-aircraft use. Close-in anti-aircraft armament varied between the ships of the class, with Lapwing completing with an armament of ten Oerlikon 20 mm cannon (4 twin and 2 single mounts). The ship carried a heavy depth charge outfit of 110 charges, and was originally planned to be fitted with eight depth-charge throwers and three rails, although this was later revised to four throwers and two chutes as this gave a more efficient pattern of depth charges.

Lapwing was laid down at Scotts Shipbuilding and Engineering Company's Greenock shipyard as yard number 605 on 17 December 1941, was launched on 16 July 1943 and completed on 21 March 1944. She was allocated the Pennant number U62, although owing to an apparent error at the shipyard, this was painted on the ship as UPT62.

HMS Lapwing Memorial
Lapwing’s memorial stone was unveiled in The Close Garden, Saffron Walden.

In December 1941, Saffron Walden Borough and Rural Councils decided to band together to raise £120,000 to adopt a ship and have the Saffron Walden coat of arms painted on its quarter deck. Through a tremendous fund-raising effort the town succeeded and was allocated HMS Lapwing in June 1942, whereupon townsfolk began knitting essentials for the crew, exchanging letters and even hanging the Lapwing crest in the Town Hall where it remains to this day.

References

Bibliography

External links
 HMS Lapwing at Naval-history.net

 

1943 ships
Black Swan-class sloops
World War II sloops of the United Kingdom
Sloops of the United Kingdom
World War II shipwrecks in the Arctic Ocean
Maritime incidents in March 1945
Ships sunk by German submarines in World War II